Uproot is a DJ mix album by American music producer DJ /rupture, released in 2008 by the record label The Agriculture. A related compilation album, Uproot: The Ingredients, was co-released, which features the original recordings used in the mix.

Reception

Pitchfork placed Uproot at number 163 on its list of the top 200 albums of the 2000s.

Track listing

Uproot
 "Reef" – Baby Kites and Nokea – 2:03
 "Elders" – Clouds – 2:44
 "Bang Soundboy" – Istari Lasterfahrer – 2:10
 "Cassava" – Nokea – 2:27
 "Winter Buds" – Atki2 – 1:31
 "Homeboys" feat. Max Normal – Maga Bo – 3:46
 "Too Much" – Clouds – 1:49
 "Mass Dampers" – Ekstrak – 2:45
 "Afghanistan" – Frescoe – 1:08
 "I Gave You All My Love" – Iron Shirt – 1:47(Matt Shadetek's I Gave You All My Dub remix)
 "Capilano Bridge" – Jenny Jones – 2:41
 "Plays John Cassavettes pt. 2" – Ekkehard Ehlers – 2:13
 "Radios et announceurs" – Stalker – 2:48
 "Ignadjossi" feat. Jhonel – Ghislain Poirier – 2:10
 "Hungry Ghosts (instrumental)" – Filastine – 2:02
 "Braille Diving" – Scuba – 1:27
 "Mirage" – Quest"Brooklyn Anthem (a cappella)" – Team Shadetek – 4:51
 "Naked" – Shackleton"Erhu Solo" – Brent Arnold – 2:29
 "Strategy Decay" – Timeblind"3akel (a cappella)" – Maga Bo – 2:50
 "Uranium" – Moving Ninja – 1:49
 "Drunken Money (Ambient Remix)" – Professor Shehab + Lloop – 2:46
 "Save from the Flames All That Yet Remains" – Dead Leaf – 3:15
 "Second-Hand Science" – We™ – 2:35

Uproot: The Ingredients
 "Reef" – Baby Kites – 2:31
 "Elders" – The Clouds – 6:10
 "Bang Soundboy" – Istari Lasterfahrer – 4:38
 "Cassava" – Nokea – 5:29
 "Winter Buds" – Atki2 – 4:00
 "Homeboys" feat. Max Normal – Maga Bo – 4:07
 "Too Much" – The Clouds – 4:41
 "Mass Dampers" – Ekstrak – 5:27
 "Afghanistan" – Frescoe – 5:17
 "I Gave You All My Love (Matt Shadetek's I Gave You All My Dub remix)" – Iron Shirt – 3:19
 "Capilano Bridge" – Jenny Jones – 3:03
 "Plays John Cassavetes pt. 2" – Ekkehard Ehlers – 9:57
 "Radios Et Announceurs" – Stalker – 3:04
 "Ignadjossi" feat. Jhonel – Ghislain Poirier – 5:01
 "Hungry Ghosts (instrumental)" – Filastine – 2:26
 "Braille Diving" – Scuba – 5:31
 "Mirage" – Quest – 4:33
 "Brooklyn Anthem" feat. 77Klash and Jah Dan (a cappella) – Team Shadetek – 2:59
 "Strategy Decay" – Timeblind – 3:48
 "3akel" feat. Bigg (a cappella)" – Maga Bo – 3:02
 "Drunken Monkey (Ambient Remix)" – Professor Shehab – 5:59
 "Save From The Flames All That Yet Remains" – Dead Leaf – 5:22
 "Second-Hand Science" – We™ – 6:04

Notes

2008 albums
DJ /rupture albums